The Gutiérrez–Magee Expedition was an 1812–1813 joint filibustering expedition by Mexico and the United States against Spanish Texas during the early years of the Mexican War of Independence.

Background
In 1810, Father Miguel Hidalgo y Costilla began a revolt against the Royalist Spanish in Mexico, which would initiate the Mexican War of Independence. Likewise, in 1811, Juan Bautista de las Casas led a revolt against Spain at San Antonio, capturing the Spanish governor. The Spanish struck back, however, crushing the revolt. Governor Manuel María de Salcedo was restored to power. Father Hidalgo was executed in July, in Chihuahua, while de las Casas and his associates were executed in August.
  
The remaining rebels then turned to the United States for help. Bernardo Gutiérrez de Lara, a blacksmith from Nuevo Santander, traveled to Washington, D.C., but he received little more than an assurance that the U.S. would not interfere with his plans.

After trying the U.S. government's patience, he entertained the idea of a filibuster, consulting as many as would listen, including his cousin Guerro Caja de las Casas. They both traveled to Louisiana, to seek support for their filibuster. They met with Governor William C. C. Claiborne and William Shaler in New Orleans.

The expedition

Gutiérrez gained the support of Augustus Magee and formed a force of 130 men at Natchitoches, Louisiana. In early August, The men then crossed into Spanish Texas and captured the town of Nacogdoches. In Texas their numbers increased to 300, and they proceeded to take the town of Santísima Trinidad de Salcedo (located on the east bank of the Trinity River at Spanish Bluff, ten miles downriver from the present Highway 31 crossing), on September 13. Their success would push them on; they traveled southward, to conquer the next Spanish stronghold.

The Spanish governor Manuel María de Salcedo, with about 800 men, was patrolling the Guadalupe River area, in search of the revolutionaries. He later found them on the lower San Antonio River at Goliad. They had easily taken and were controlling the Spanish fort there, Presidio La Bahia. Magee was besieged for four months. He negotiated with the Spanish military leaders and considered surrendering, but he finally decided to fight. However, Magee's army lost confidence in him, and discord spread among the republican leaders. Magee died on February 6, 1813, following a long illness, and Samuel Kemper succeeded to the command. Captain John McFarland was sent to find new recruits: volunteers from Nacogdoches, Spanish army defectors, and a few Coushatta Indians joined in.

Kemper beat back the governor's attacks. On February 10 and 13, Kemper successfully defeated Salcedo, who retreated toward San Antonio on February 19. In March, Kemper's forces again swelled, by some 500 men. The expedition would pursue the Spanish, now in Bexar. Joining the Republican Army in the pursuit to San Antonio were volunteers, consisting of Americans, Tejanos, former Spanish soldiers, and Lipan and Tonkawa Indians. On March 29, they defeated Simón de Herrera's Spanish army of 1,200 men, at the Battle of Rosillo Creek (Salado Creek). Governor Salcedo surrendered on April 1, 1813.

Gutiérrez suggested the prisoners be sent to the United States for safe keeping. But, as the prisoners were marched out of town by Captain Antonio Delgado, they were halted, tied to trees and killed. On April 17, the Republican Army drafted a declaration of independence of the state of Texas as part of the Mexican Republic and adopted a solid "Green Flag" for a banner. Gutiérrez declared himself governor of the new state. 
 
Because of poor judgement, Gutiérrez would lose the confidence of Kemper and the other Americans. His proclamation, and allowing the execution of the Spanish governor and other officials, proved to be too much. Kemper ended up quitting and led about 100 Americans back to Louisiana and took no further part. The republicans looked for a new leader.

Colonel Ignacio Elizondo and General José Joaquín de Arredondo took charge of the Spanish effort to secure Texas. Elizondo laid siege to San Antonio with 900 men. Without Kemper's leadership, the rebels suffered from internal divisions. First Reuben Ross took command, but was unsupported and dropped to second in command. The job next fell to United States Colonel Henry Perry. On June 20, Perry routed Elizondo's troops in a dawn attack, at the Battle of Alazan Creek, once again freeing the Spanish hold on San Antonio. The splintered Spanish Army would have to regroup.

The success of the Republican Army began to stir additional support. Now interested in the conflict was José Álvarez de Toledo y Dubois, who had been consulted at the beginning of the filibuster. He proceeded into San Antonio on August 1, with the desire to take charge of the Texians and confront Arredondo. Advising was United States special agent William Shaler. Shaler and José Álvarez de Toledo teamed up and initiated a propaganda campaign against organizer Gutiérrez. The Americans, convinced that Gutiérrez was not concerned with their interests, threatened to leave unless Gutiérrez was replaced. Gutiérrez exited for Natchitoches on August 6, which ultimately saved his life. In his absence, Toledo took charge.

The Republican Army's dissension persisted. Some Texians liked their new leader, while others didn't. Toledo wanted to fight the Spanish in Bexar, but was persuaded by Perry and San Antonians to spare the city and march out to surprise the Spanish. Colonel José Menchaca (a former Spanish officer, now leader of the Tejanos), being opposed to Toledo as their leader, instigated discord, slowing Álvarez de Toledo's advance against the Spanish. The Republican leader, Toledo was not able to make his move upon the Royalists until August 15.

This situation would end up badly for the Texans. Even though they had decisively won at the battle of Alazán and now had a large force, (composed of 1,400 Americans, Tejanos, Spanish, Indians, and blacks), they would suffer a crushing defeat on August 18, 1813, at the Battle of Medina. Toledo had planned on surprising the Spanish, but when he moved upon them it turned into an unintentional ambush. Toledo tried to turn the men around, but Colonel José Menchaca had chosen to fight till the death. By chasing what appeared to be the main body of the Spaniards, they would end up surrounded. For in the meantime, Arredondo and Elizondo had reorganized a force of 1,800 and were ready to fight. The Gutiérrez-Magee expedition ended with a terrible loss of some 1,300 men. Toledo and a few of the men were able to flee to the United States.

Spanish officials recaptured San Antonio and conducted a brutal reprisal, executing over 300 people. The situation in Nacogdoches was hardly any better, where they were brutally purging the rebels. On September 12, however, Elizondo's ruthlessness was ended, when he was assassinated by one of his own officers.

The repercussions and vengeance of the Spanish caused many to flee Texas, and they would never fully come to trust the Spanish royal family again. San Antonio natives and future signers of the 1836 Texas Declaration of Independence José Francisco Ruiz and José Antonio Navarro were among those who fled Texas. Texas would remain a hot spot for revolution and filibusters for years to come.

See also
Battle of Medina
History of Texas
Samuel Kemper
Reuben Kemper

References

 
 

Morón Villarreal, Jesus; Gutiérrez and Magee, Tex-Mex heroes; Houston, Tex. : J. Morón Villarreal, 1995. 
Walker, Henry P; William McLane's narrative of the Magee-Gutierrez expedition, 1812-1813; Austin, Tex. : Texas State Historical Assoc., 1962–1963.

External links
Expedition in the Handbook of Texas
Governor Salcedo

Mexican War of Independence
Conflicts in 1812
Conflicts in 1813